The Grand Duchy of Ryazan (1078–1521) was a duchy with the capital in Old Ryazan (destroyed by the Mongol Empire in 1237), and then in Pereyaslavl Ryazansky, which later became the modern-day city of Ryazan. It originally split off from the Chernigov Principality as the provincial Murom Principality.

Prior to the invasion of Batu Khan
Sometime between 1097 and 1155, the principality became a sovereign state and until 1161, according to the Hypatian Codex, the official name was the Muromo-Ryazan Principality. The first ruler of Ryazan was supposedly Yaroslav Sviatoslavich, Prince of Chernigov (a city of Kievan Rus'), later Prince of Murom-Ryzan. The capital of the Grand Duchy became Ryazan, however the present-day city of Ryazan is located 40 miles north from the original site of the capital today known as Ryazan Staraya (Old Ryazan). By the end of 12th century, the Principality waged wars with the neighboring Grand Duchy of Vladimir. In the course of that stand-off, the city of Ryazan was burned twice in a span of twenty years from 1186 to 1208. In 1217, there was a culminate point in history of Ryazan when during the civil war inside the Duchy six leaders of the state were killed by Gleb Vladimirovich who later defected to Cumans. Sometime around that time the Duchy came under a great influence from the Vladimir-Suzdal which was a factor in the fight of Ryazan to resume its sovereignty. In 1217, Gleb Vladimirovich with the support of Cumans tried to take Ryazan back out of the influence of neighboring northern principality of Vladimir, but he was defeated by another Ryazan prince Ingvar Igorevich who in turn became a sole ruler of the state.

In December 1237, the Duchy became the first of all other former states of Kievan Rus' to suffer from the Mongol invasion. The Duchy was completely overrun, with almost the whole princely family killed, the capital destroyed, and later moved to another location. In 1238, some of the armed forces of Ryazan withdrew to unite with the Vladimir-Suzdal army and meet with the forces of Batu Khan near Kolomna.

Golden Horde period
In 1301 Prince Daniel of Moscow took Ryazan due to the boyars' betrayal and imprisoned Prince . In 1305 Daniel's son Prince Yury of Moscow ordered his death. The two next successors of Konstantin were killed by the Golden Horde. In 1380, Prince Oleg Ivanovich did not take part in the Battle of Kulikovo, although he was in ally of Mamai.

During almost all its history, the Ryazan Principality was in conflict with its provincial Pronsk Principality until Ryazan completely annexed Pronsk in 1483 during the regency of Anna of Ryazan.

Annexation of Ryazan
In 1520, Grand Prince Vasili III of Russia captured and imprisoned in Moscow the last Grand Prince of Ryazan Ivan V because of his relations with the Crimean Khan Mehmed I Giray. In 1521, Prince Ivan Ivanovich fled into the Grand Duchy of Lithuania. After that, in 1521, the Ryazan Principality was merged with Muscovy.

List of Princes of Ryazan

In Murom
 1127–1129 Yaroslav I of Murom and Ryazan *exiled from Chernigov

In Ryazan 
 1129–1143 Sviatoslav of Ryazan *his son
 1143–1145 Rostislav of Ryazan *lost Ryazan to Suzdal, but reclaimed it using Cumans
 1145–1178 Gleb I of Ryazan *plundered Vladimir and Moscow, but died in captivity in Vladimir
 1180–1207 Roman I of Ryazan *ruled as vasal of Vsevolod the Big Nest, Grand Prince of Vladimir, but died in his dungeon
 1208–1208 Yaroslav II of Ryazan*son of Vsevolod the Big Nest
 1208–1212 governors from Vladimir
 1212–1217 Roman II of Ryazan *nephew of Roman I, held captive in Vladimir, but released as their vasal 
 1217–1218 Gleb II of Ryazan *nephew of Roman I, betrayed his uncle for Vladimir and executed Roman II and 6 of his relatives using Kumans
 1218–1235 Ingvar I of Ryazan *brother of Roman II, defeated and exiled Gleb II
 1235–1237 Yuri of Ryazan *his brother, killed by Mongols, city destroyed

In Pereslavl-Ryazansky, later renamed to Ryazan 
 1237–1252 Ingvar II of Pereslavl-Ryazansky *son of Ingvar I, his existence is disputed
 1252–1258 Oleg the Red *his brother, captured by Mongols in Battle of Kolomna, but ruled as their vasal and died as a monk
 1258–1270 Roman III of Ryazan, the Saint *his son, ruled as Mongol vasal but executed for his faith
 1270–1294 Fyodor I of Ryazan *his son, resisted Tatar raids in 1278 and 1288
 1294–1299 Yaroslav III of Ryazan *his son
 1299–1301 Konstantin of Ryazan *his brother, executed in Moscow
 1301–1308 Vasily I of Ryazan *his son, executed in Golden Horde
 1308–1327 Ivan I of Ryazan *son of Yaroslav III, executed in Golden Horde
 1327–1342 Ivan II Korotopol *his son, died in exile
 1342–1344 Yaroslav IV of Ryazan *his cousin, usurped the throne with Tatar help
 1344–1350 Vasily II of Ryazan *his cousin
 1350–1402 Oleg II of Ryazan *son of Ivan II, in 1380 fought at Kulikovo on Tatar side, but secretly sent most of his army to help Moscow
 1402–1427 Fyodor II of Ryazan *his son, married to daughter of Dmitry Donskoy and made alliance with Moscow
 1427–1456 Ivan III of Ryazan *his son, renounced his allegiance to Golden Horde
 1456–1483 Vasily III of Ryazan *his son, raised in the Moscow court, married to sister of Ivan III of Russia, ally of Moscow
 1483–1500 Ivan IV of Ryazan *swore allegiance to Ivan III of Russia
 1500–1521 Ivan V of Ryazan *the last Grand Prince, d.1534 in Lithuania

See also
 Ryazan Oblast

External links

  Ryazan Principality
  Map of Ryazan Principality
  Genealogy of Princes of Ryazan

1129 establishments in Europe
12th-century establishments in Russia
1521 disestablishments in Europe
History of Ryazan Oblast
Medieval Russia

Lists of monarchs
Ryazan
Subdivisions of Kievan Rus'